Montignac-Charente is a commune in the Charente department in southwestern France.

Population

Sights and monuments
 Château de Montignac - keep and remains of an 11th-13th century castle, listed since 1962 as a monument historique by the Ministry of Culture.
 The bronze bell in the parish church of Notre-Dame weighs 200 kg and dates from 1666 and has been classified by the French Ministry of Culture as a monument historique since 1944. It is engraved:
SANCTA+MARIA+ORA+PRO+NOBIS+ME+FRANÇOIS CAZIER+PRETRE+CURE+DE L'EGLISE+DE+NOSTRE+DAME+DE+MONTIGNAC+CHARANTE+PARRIN+TRES+HAUT+TRES PUISSANT+ET+TRES ILLUSTRE+MESSIRE CHARLES+DUC DE LA ROCHEFOUCAULD+PAIR+DE+FRANCE+MARRINE+TRES HAUTE+ET+TRES PUISSANTE DAME AGNES+DUPLESSIS+DE+LEANCOURT+PRINCESSE+DE+MARSILLAC FABRICEURS+MES+CHARLES+THINON+ET PIERRE+PAPPOTP.CHARPENTIER M'A FONDU EN 1666.

See also
Communes of the Charente department

References

Communes of Charente